Iroquois Airport  is located adjacent to Iroquois, Ontario, Canada on the shores of the Saint Lawrence River.

References

Registered aerodromes in Ontario